The Face in the Moonlight is a 1915 American silent historical drama film directed by Albert Capellani and starring Robert Warwick, Stella Archer, and H. Cooper Cliffe.

Cast
 Robert Warwick as Victor / Rabat  
 Stella Archer as Lucille  
 H. Cooper Cliffe as Munier  
 Montagu Love as Ambrose  
 Dorothy Fairchild as Jeanne Mailloche  
 George MacIntyre
 Elaine Hammerstein

References

Bibliography
 Langman, Larry. Destination Hollywood: The Influence of Europeans on American Filmmaking. McFarland, 2000.

External links
 

1915 films
1910s historical drama films
American silent feature films
American historical drama films
Films set in France
Films directed by Albert Capellani
Films set in the 19th century
American black-and-white films
1915 drama films
1910s English-language films
1910s American films
Silent American drama films
Silent historical drama films